Jeremy Mark Noble (born 9 July 1960) is an English writer, screenwriter, playwright and actor.

Early life and education

Noble attended King's School, Bruton, and read English Literature at Magdalene College, Cambridge, where he was supervised by the poet Geoffrey Hill, and graduated with upper second-class honours in 1987. He won a Half Blue for polo, playing for Cambridge University against Oxford University (Cambridge won 3–2, 7 June 1987). He was honorary treasurer for Cambridge University Polo Club.

Career

Noble moved to Saint Petersburg, Russia, to become a writer. He has since worked with various Russian cultural figures including Valery Gergiev, Alexander Sokurov, and Vladimir Bortko.

Noble has written for The Washington Post, St. Petersburg Press, P. N. Review, Literary Review, Open Democracy Russia, and Open Russia. He has written extensively about Russian ballet, and for Dance Magazine.

Noble has translated extensively from Russian into English, for major arts organisations and events, the president of the Russian Federation, and the mayor of Moscow.

Noble wrote the English-language dialogue for the 2005 film The Sun (directed by Alexander Sokurov). His play Marlene Made Me was shortlisted for the UK International Playwriting Festival, 2004. He was co-writer and guest historian for Glamour Puds, series 2, episode 9.

He has been seen on Russian TV in the role of Dr Paulson in Peter the Great: The Testament, directed by Vladimir Bortko, and on Ukrainian TV in the role of President of the Council of Vampires in Split, directed by Vlad Lanne.

Noble wrote the English-language dialogue for the 2015 film Dusha shpiona (in English The Soul of a Spy), directed by Vladimir Bortko, starring Malcolm McDowell, Liam Cunningham, Sandrine Bonnaire, Fyodor Bondarchuk, and Andrey Chernyshov.

Noble co-wrote the book for Kingmaker the Musical, which received its premiere at the St James Theatre, London, 31 March 2015.

He is the editor of Opposing Forces: Plotting the new Russia, a published account of the conversation in Red Square, Moscow, between opposition leader Alexei Navalny and the Polish intellectual and former dissident Adam Michnik.

His first novel Villa Eilenroc was published in 2016. His second novel A Russian Ending was published in 2022.

Writing and acting credits

Bibliography

References

External links
 
 

1960 births
English male television actors
English dramatists and playwrights
Living people
English male dramatists and playwrights